Transmembrane protein 196 is a protein that in humans is encoded by the TMEM196 gene.

References

Further reading